The Sunshine State Games is an Olympics-style amateur sports competition for residents of Florida, United States. The event is part of the National Congress of State Games. The games began in 1980 and are held throughout the year.

Sports
 Archery
 Badminton
 Basketball
 Canoe/Kayak
 Fencing
 Figure skating
 Inline hockey
 Judo
 Jump rope
 Karate
 Lacrosse
 Powerlifting
 Racquetball
 Road race
 Rugby
 Softball
 Swimming
 Tennis
 Track and field
 Volleyball
 Water polo
 Wrestling

References

External links
 Florida Sports
 Sunshine State Games

1980 establishments in Florida
Multi-sport events in the United States
Recurring sporting events established in 1980
Sports competitions in Florida